South Carolina Highway 496 (SC 496) is a  primary state highway in the U.S. state of South Carolina. It serves as an unsigned state-maintained truck route through and around Union.

Route description
SC 496 is a short  unsigned highway that connects the industrial park area and downtown area of Union. From SC 49 to U.S. Route 176 (US 176), SC 18 Truck, and SC 215, it is known as Industrial Park Road; from US 176/SC 18 Truck/SC 215 to SC 18, it is called Union Boulevard. On Industrial Park Road, it is a two-lane highway, concurrent with SC 49 Truck. On Union Boulevard it is a four-lane highway.

History
SC 496 was established by 1980 as a new primary routing in Union from SC 49 to SC 18. It has not changed inception.

Major intersections

See also

References

External links

 
 SC 496 at Virginia Highways' South Carolina Highways Annex

496
Transportation in Union County, South Carolina